The 2000 FIBA Africa Championship for Women was the 15th FIBA Africa Championship for Women, played under the rules of FIBA, the world governing body for basketball, and the FIBA Africa thereof. The tournament was hosted by Tunisia from November 5 to 12, 2000.

Senegal defeated Tunisia 71–63 in the final to win their first title. with both winner and runner-up securing a spot at the 2002 FIBA World Cup.

Squads

Draw

Preliminary round

Group A

Group B

Knockout stage

9th place match

7th place match

5th place match

Semifinals bracket

Semifinals

Bronze medal match

Final

Final standings

Awards

All-Tournament Team

Statistical Leaders

External links
Official Website

References

FIBA Africa Championship for Women
FIBA Africa Championship for Women
AfroBasket Women
International basketball competitions hosted by Tunisia
FIBA Africa Championship for Women